Castillo de Bujalance (originally, Bury al-Hans ("tower of the snake") is a castle located in the town of Bujalance, in Andalucia southern Spain, in the province of Córdoba. It was built in the 10th century during the Caliphate of Abd-ar-Rahman III. It is a clear example of Muslim military architecture in Al-Andalus. It subsequently underwent several modernizations, most recently in 1512, which were paid for by Queen Joanna of Castile. The castle's original name, "tower of the snake", and the fact that it had seven towers, led to the current name of the city and its coat of arms. In 1963, the Ministry of Culture declared the site a Bien de Interés Cultural monument. Currently, its courtyard is used as a cultural space, which is in the process of being catalogued, restored and reconstructed. Highlights include the Festival of Theatre, Music and Dance (Nights at the Citadel) and Andalusian Dinner during the summer months.

Castles in Andalusia
Bien de Interés Cultural landmarks in the Province of Córdoba (Spain)
10th-century establishments in Al-Andalus
Towers completed in the 10th century